Johan Dessing (born 1965) is a Dutch politician and a member of the Senate for the Forum for Democracy party.

Before entering politics, Dessing was an air traffic controller at Amsterdam Schiphol Airport. Dessing has been a member of the Provincial Council in North-Holland since 28 March 2019 and the party leader of the FvD in the province. On 11 June 2019 he was also installed as a senator in the Senate. Since March 2022, he has been the party's only senator and is therefore parliamentary leader. He is the brother of Dutch television presenter Floortje Dessing.

See also
List of members of the Senate of the Netherlands, 2019–2023

References

External links
Twitter profile
Senate website
Profile at parlement.com

1965 births
21st-century Dutch politicians
Living people
Members of the Senate (Netherlands)
Forum for Democracy (Netherlands) politicians
Politicians from Amsterdam